The 2015 China International Guangzhou was a professional tennis tournament played on hard courts. It was the 4th edition of the tournament which was part of the 2015 ATP Challenger Tour. It took place in Guangzhou, China between 9 and 15 March 2015.

Singles main draw entrants

Seeds

 1 Rankings are as of March 2, 2015

Other entrants
The following players received wildcards into the singles main draw:
  Zheng Weiqiang
  Wu Di
  Li Zhe
  Wang Chuhan

The following players received entry from the qualifying draw:
  Yusuke Watanuki
  Matwé Middelkoop
  Riccardo Ghedin
  Richard Becker

Champions

Singles

 Kimmer Coppejans def.  Roberto Marcora, 7–6(8–6), 5–7, 6–1

Doubles

 Daniel Muñoz de la Nava /  Aleksandr Nedovyesov def.  Fabrice Martin /  Purav Raja, 6–2, 7–5

References
 Combo Main Draw

External links

China International Guangzhou
China International Guangzhou
2015 in Chinese tennis